The eighth and final season of the sitcom Mom premiered November 5, 2020 on CBS in the United States. The season is produced by Chuck Lorre Productions and Warner Bros. Television, with series creators Chuck Lorre, Eddie Gorodetsky and Gemma Baker serving as executive producer. This is also the only season in which Anna Faris is not featured.

Bonnie (Allison Janney) must learn to adjust without her daughter and former-roommate, Christy, around. With her chaotic past behind her and a newly empty nest, she focuses on her marriage to her husband, Adam (William Fichtner), and on what she wants to be now that she has finally grown up. Now more than ever, Bonnie depends on the support of her friends, including the wise Marjorie (Mimi Kennedy), the wealthy and sometimes misguided Jill (Jaime Pressly), the overly emotional Wendy (Beth Hall) and her loudmouthed but sweet former foster sister, Tammy (Kristen Johnston). Collectively, they help each other overcome their mistakes and stay sober in the face of whatever life throws at them. The episodes are usually titled with two odd topics that are mentioned in that episode.

As of May 13, 2021, 170 episodes of Mom have aired, concluding the eighth season and the series.

Cast

Main
 Allison Janney as Bonnie Plunkett
 Mimi Kennedy as Marjorie Armstrong-Perugian
 Jaime Pressly as Jill Kendall
 Beth Hall as Wendy Harris
 William Fichtner as Adam Janikowski
 Kristen Johnston as Tammy Diffendorf

Recurring
 Lauri Johnson as Beatrice
 Will Sasso as Andy
 Rainn Wilson as Trevor Wells
 French Stewart as Chef Rudy
 Reggie de Leon as Paul
 Chiquita Fuller as Taylor

Special guest stars
 Kevin Dunn as Gary
 Steve Valentine as Rod Knaughton
 Kevin Pollak as Alvin Lester Biletnikoff
 Tyne Daly as Barbara
 Bob Odenkirk as Hank
 Dan Bucatinsky as Arthur
 Melanie Lynskey as Shannon
 Rondi Reed as Jolene

Guest stars
 Rebecca Metz as Bobbi
 Natasha Hall as Shawn
 Jane Carr as Betty
 Kiff VandenHeuvel as Zeke
 Rob Brownstein as Dr. Mekizian
 Melody Butiu as Lorena
 Asante Jones as Corey
 Susan Chuang as Luanne
 Mark Fite as Wendell
 Virginia Montero as Marta
 Hermie Castillo as Josh
 David Theune as Lou
 Stephen Monroe Taylor as Darryl
 Malcom Foster Smith as Mookie
 Sonya Leslie as Nancy
 Matt Cedeño as Vincent
 Galen Hooks as Melinda
 Sandy Martin as Lillian
 Lilli Birdsell as Lydia
 Wallace Langham as Jerry
 Marcuis W. Harris as Clayton
 George Anthony Bell as Justice of the Peace

Episodes

Ratings

References

Mom (TV series)
2020 American television seasons
2021 American television seasons